The following is a list of ambassadors of Brazil, or other chiefs of mission, to the United States of America. The title given by the Ministry of External Relations of the Federative Republic of Brazil to this position is currently "Ambassador Extraordinary and Plenipotentiary".
There have been fifty representatives of various ranks and titles from Brazil to the United States since diplomatic relations were  inaugurated in 1824 to the present.

The United States of America was the second country to recognize Brazil's Declaration of Independence, which was proclaimed in September 1822, by the regent, heir and crown prince to the throne of the former United Kingdom of Portugal, Brazil and Algarves, Dom Pedro of the House of Braganza. He soon became Emperor Pedro I (1798-1834, reigned 1822-1834), of the Empire of Brazil, which endured under his son Dom Pedro II until 1889, when the present republic and federation were established. The huge South American nation's first legation was thus established in Washington, only a quarter-century after the founding of the American national capital and federal district itself. The long Brazilian-North American diplomatic relationship and inter-continental friendship was founded on May 26, 1824, when José Silvestre Rebello presented his diplomatic accreditation credentials as first Charge d'Affaires to fifth President James Monroe (1758-1831, served 1817-1825), at the newly restored Executive Mansion, now acquiring its new nickname and title of the White House, having been burned only a decade before by the invading British. He represented the new Emperor and Empire of Brazil for over five years to August 1829.

In 1905, the United States Legation representing the U.S. Department of State and its Secretary of State in the original coastal capital city of Rio de Janeiro was raised to a full embassy under 26th President Theodore Roosevelt (1858-1919, served 1901-1909), similar to the gradual increased status of diplomatic missions across the board in international relations in the 20th century.

See also
 List of ambassadors of the United States to Brazil
 Embassy of Brazil, Washington, D.C.
 Brazil–United States relations

References

External links
 Brazilian Embassy in Washington

United States
Brazil